Underexposure is a 2005 Iraqi film, in the docufiction style, written and directed by Oday Rasheed, produced by Enlil Film and Arts. The story follows a fictional Iraqi film crew, inspired by the actual crew, that struggles with making a film during the 2003 invasion of Iraq and subsequent American occupation. It was the first feature film to be shot in Iraq after the beginning of the Iraq War.

Plot summary

The title Underexposure is not only a reference to the expired film stock on which the movie was filmed, but a commentary on the lives of a generation of Iraqis who grew up during the Iraq embargo, isolated from the world. In Underexposure, a fictional film crew copes with the frustration and fear of the Iraq War in Baghdad by making a movie. Friends, lovers, strangers, and family members are woven together by the complexities of their new reality. Along the way friends die and they encounter resistance from people who do not want to be filmed. Ultimately the burgeoning efforts to make the best of their gruesome reality end in tragedy.

Production

Underexposure was shot on expired Kodak film that was bought back from looters in the early days of the American occupation. Underexposure was produced by Enlil Film and Arts, with Producer and Production Designer Majed Rasheed and Executive Producer Furat Al Jamil. Filming began in November 2003 with money that the crew raised by selling their own possessions. Underexposure was the first movie to be filmed in Iraq after the fall of Saddam Hussein and the first Iraqi film in over a decade to not be censored by the Ba'ath party. Filming was finished in April 2004 and the film was released in June 2005 after post-production was completed in Berlin, Germany, with co-producers Tom Tykwer and Maria Köpf of X Filme Creative Pool.

Cast

Samar Qahtan as Hassan, director
Myriam Abbas as Maysoon, Hassan's wife (also: Meriam Abbas)
Hussein Abdul-Kareem as Boy
Yousef al-Any as Abu Shaker (also: Yousif Al-Ani)
Basim Hajar as Mataz
Basim Hamad as Soldier
Hayder Helo as Nasser
Majed Rasheed as Ziyad
Muhanad Rasheed as Sound technician
Awatif Salman as Futha

Crew

Oday Rasheed Director / Scriptwriter
Majed Rasheed Producer / Production Designer
Furat Al Jamil Executive Producer
Gabriel Yared Original soundtrack composition
Ziad Turkey Director of Photography / Director / Photographer
Hayder Helo Scriptwriter / Assistant Director / Theatrical Director / Actor
Murad Atshan Assistant Director / Scriptwriter
Faris Harram Scriptwriter / Poet
Osama Rasheed Assistant Director / Graphics Designer
Fady Fadhil Assistant Cameraman / Graphics Designer
Muhanad Rasheed Assistant Cameraman / Graphics Designer / Theatrical Dancer
Dhurgham Abdul-Wahid Art Director Luay Fadhil Assistant Art Director
Adel Khalid Production Assistant
Hussein Atshan Production Assistant
Salam Al-Sukeiny Press Officer
Yasar Qadir Assistant Press Officer
Iman Qasim Sound Engineer
Basim Fahim Camera Mover
Ammar Al-Asmar Assistant Sound Engineer
Abbas Al-Dayekh Assistant Camera Mover

Critical reception

Underexposure was shown in film festivals around the world, including The Rotterdam International Film Festival (Netherlands 2005, World Premiere), the Febio Festival (Czech Republic 2005), Arab Film Festival Japan (2005), Singapore International Film Festival (2005), Arab Film Festival (Netherlands 2005), Durban International Film Festival (South Africa 2005), Munich Film Festival (Germany 2005), Osians Cinefan Asian Film Festival (India 2005), Alexandria International Film Festival (Egypt 2005), La Mostra de Valencia (Spain 2005). Additionally, Oday Rasheed received numerous awards for his work on Underexposure.

'''Awards:

Best Film Award, 18th Singapore International Film Festival 2005 (Underexposure)
Golden Hawk (Best Feature Film), 5th Arab Film Festival, The Netherlands, 2005 (Underexposure)
Best Script, Wahran International Film Festival, Algeria 2007 (Underexposure)

See also 
 Docufiction
 List of docufiction films

References

External links
IMDB - Underexposure
Sydney Arab Film Festival - Film Makers - Oday Rasheed
Sydney Arab Film Festival - Films - Underexposure
Qantara.de - Blinking Incredulously At the Sun
Qantara.de - Liebesbriefe an Baghdad
LA Weekly - Lights ... Camera ... Hit the Dirt!
X-Filme - Underexposure

2005 drama films
Docufiction films
2005 films
2000s Arabic-language films
Iraqi drama films
Films scored by Gabriel Yared